William Antonio Maldonado López (born January 3, 1990) is a Salvadoran professional footballer, who plays as a midfielder.

Club career

San Salvador FC
Maldonado's professional career began on July 3, 2007 when he signed a contract with now defunct Salvadoran national league club, San Salvador FC. He was one of six players from the El Salvador U17 national team, that would sign for San Salvador that season. The others were Ricardo Orellana, Diego Chavarría, Xavier García, Óscar Arroyo and Fabricio Alfaro.

He first gained the attention of league teams as a member of the 2006–2007 El Salvador U17 national team, where he showed a lot of potential, with his creative passing, speed and exceptional free kicks.

He made his professional debut on September 23, 2007, in a league match against Alianza, and scored his first goal on October 7 that same year in a match against FAS. His second goal came four months later on February 20 in a 2–2 away draw against Chalatenango.

Return to FAS
In May 2017, Maldonado signed again with FAS for the Apertura 2017. With FAS, Maldonado reached the semi-finals of the Apertura 2018, but they were defeated by Alianza.

In December 2018, FAS did not renew Maldonado's contract.

International career
Maldonado made his debut, aged only 17, for El Salvador in a November 2007 friendly match against Jamaica, coming on as a late sub for Shawn Martin. The match has been his only senior international so far.

Career statistics

Club
As of March 19, 2017.

Honours
 Santa Tecla
 Primera División (1): Clausura 2015

References

External links
 William Maldonado at Soccerway 

1990 births
Living people
Sportspeople from Santa Ana, El Salvador
Association football midfielders
Salvadoran footballers
El Salvador international footballers
San Salvador F.C. footballers
C.D. FAS footballers
Santa Tecla F.C. footballers
2015 CONCACAF Gold Cup players
El Salvador under-20 international footballers
El Salvador youth international footballers